Rajasthani refers to a group of Indo-Aryan languages and dialects spoken primarily in the state of Rajasthan and adjacent areas of Haryana, Gujarat, and Madhya Pradesh in India. There are also speakers in the Pakistani provinces of Punjab and Sindh. Rajasthani varieties are closely related to and partially intelligible with their sister languages Gujarati and Sindhi. It is spoken by 65.04% of the population of Rajasthan. The comprehensibility between Rajasthani and Gujarati goes from 60 to 85% depending on the geographical extent of its dialects.

The term Rajasthani is also used to refer to a literary language mostly based on Marwari, which is being promoted as a standard language for the state of Rajasthan.

History
Rajasthani has a literary tradition going back approximately 1500 years. The Vasantgadh Inscription from modern day Sirohi  that has been dated to the 7th century AD uses the term Rajasthaniaditya in reference to the official or maybe for a poet or a bhat who wrote in Rajasthani.  The ancient astronomer and mathematician Brahmagupta of Bhinmal composed the Brāhmasphuṭasiddhānta. In 779 AD, Udhyotan Suri wrote the Kuvalaya Mala partly in Prakrit and partly in Apabhraṃśa. Texts of this era display characteristic Gujarati features such as direct/oblique noun forms, post-positions, and auxiliary verbs. It had three genders as Gujarati does today. During the medieval period, the literary language split into Medieval Marwari and Gujarati.

By around 1300 AD a fairly standardised form of this language emerged. While generally known as Old Gujarati, some scholars prefer the name of Old Western Rajasthani, based on the argument that Gujarati and Rajasthani were not distinct at the time. Also factoring into this preference was the belief that modern Rajasthani sporadically expressed a neuter gender, based on the incorrect conclusion that the [ũ] that came to be pronounced in some areas for masculine [o] after a nasal consonant was analogous to Gujarati's neuter [ũ]. A formal grammar of the precursor to this language was written by Jain monk and eminent scholar Hemachandra Suri in the reign of Solanki king Jayasimha Siddharaja. Maharana Kumbha wrote Sangeet Raj, a book on musicology and a treatise on Jai Deva’s Geet Govinda.

Geographical distribution
Most of the Rajasthani languages are chiefly spoken in the state of Rajasthan but are also spoken in Gujarat, Haryana and Punjab. Rajasthani languages are also spoken in the Bahawalpur and Multan sectors of the Pakistani provinces of Punjab and Tharparkar district of Sindh. It merges with Riasti and Saraiki in Bahawalpur and Multan areas, respectively. Many linguists (Shackle, 1976 and Gusain, 2000) agree that it shares many phonological (implosives), morphological (future tense marker and negation) and syntactic features with Riasti and Saraiki. A distribution of the geographical area can be found in 'Linguistic Survey of India' by George A. Grierson.

Classification
The Rajasthani languages belong to the Western Indo-Aryan language family. However, they are controversially conflated with the Hindi languages of the Central-Zone in the Indian national census, among other places. The main Rajasthani subgroups are:

Western Rajasthani group which includes- Marwari and its subdialects, Mewari, Wagdi, Bagri and Bhili
Eastern Rajasthani group or Dhundari which includes- Jaipuri, Hadoti, Malvi and Nimadi

Standard Rajasthani: the common lingua franca of Rajasthani people and is spoken by over 25 million people (2011) in different parts of Rajasthan. It has to be taken into consideration, however, that some speakers of Standard Rajasthani are conflated with Hindi speakers in the census.
Marwari: the most spoken Rajasthani language with approximately 8 million speakers situated in the historic Marwar region of western Rajasthan.
Malvi: approximately 5 million speakers in the Malwa region of Madhya Pradesh. The dialects of Malvi are Ujjaini (Ujjain, Dhar, Indore, Dewas, Shajapur, Sehore districts), Rajawadi (Ratlam, Mandsaur, Neemuch districts), Umathwadi (Rajgarh district), and Sondhwadi (Jhalawar district). Ujjaini is the prestige dialect, and the language as a whole sometimes goes by that name.mixed dialect of malvi bhoyari speak in betul and chhindwada district.
Dhundhari: approximately 1.4 million speakers in the Dhundhar region of Rajasthan and the metropolitan nature of the district has led to Hindisation.	
Harauti: approximately 3 million speakers in the Hadoti region of Rajasthan.
Mewari: approximately 5 million speakers in the Mewar region of Rajasthan 
Lambadi,is one of the major dialect of Rajasthani language spoken by Banjaras of Maharashtra, Karnataka and Andhra Pradesh with the population about 4.5 Million people.Approximately about 2% in Karnataka,3.5% in Maharashtra and 8% in Andhra Pradesh speakers speaks Lambani as primary language.Lambani dialect speakers uses Devnagari script in Maharashtra, Kannada in Karnataka, Telugu in Telangana.Recently a new script was introduced by a government teacher from Raichur district of Karnataka which is also published in Public news.
Shekhawati: approximately 1 million speakers in the Shekhawati region of Rajasthan. 
Wagdi:approx 3.3million speakers, spoken mainly in southern region which include Dungarpur & Banswara districts also called Wagad region and it is counted under the Bhilodi non scheduled category
Bagri: approximately 1.4 million speakers in northern Rajasthan and North western and western Haryana. There are also few speakers situated in southern Punjab.
Nimadi: approximately 2.2 million speakers in the Nimar region of Madhya Pradesh.
Ahirani: approximately 1.9 million speakers in the Khandesh region of Maharashtra
Dhatki, is a major sub dialect of Marwari with approximately 2 million speakers in Barmer Jaisalmer and Umarkot Tharparkar region of Pakistan
Godwari, is a major sub dialect of Marwari with approximately 1.5-2 million speakers in Pali, Sirohidistricts of Rajasthan and Banaskantha district of Gujarat.

Bhili, is the language of the Bhil tribe living in southern Rajasthan, Gujrat and Madhya Pradesh.
Saharia, is the language of Saharia Adivasi's living in the Baran district of Rajasthan and surrounding areas.

Official status
India's National Academy of Letters, the Sahitya Akademi, and University Grants Commission recognize Rajasthani as a distinct language, and it is taught as such in both Jodhpur's Jai Narain Vyas University and Udaipur's Mohanlal Sukhadia University. The state Board of Secondary Education included Rajasthani in its course of studies, and it has been an optional subject since 1973. National recognition has lagged, however.

In 2003, the Rajasthan Legislative Assembly passed a unanimous resolution to insert recognition of Rajasthani into the Eighth Schedule of the Constitution of India. In May 2015, a senior member of the pressure group Rajasthani Bhasha Manyata Samiti said at a New Delhi press conference: "Twelve years have passed, but there has absolutely been no forward movement."

All 25 Members of Parliament elected from Rajasthan state, as well as former Chief Minister, Vasundhara Raje Scindia, have also voiced support for official recognition of the language.

Writing system

In India, Rajasthani is written in the Devanagari script, an abugida which is written from left to right. Earlier, the Mahajani script, or Modiya, was used to write Rajasthani. The script is also called as Maru Gurjari in a few records. In Pakistan, where Rajasthani is considered a minor language, a variant of the Sindhi script is used to write Rajasthani dialects.

Salient features
In common with most other Indo-Iranian languages, the basic sentence typology is subject–object–verb. On a lexical level, Rajasthani has perhaps a 50 to 65 percent overlap with Hindi, based on a comparison of a 210-word Swadesh list. Most pronouns and interrogative words differ from Hindi, but the language does have several regular correspondences with, and phonetic transformations from, Hindi. The /s/ in Hindi is often realized as /h/ in Rajasthani — for example, the word ‘gold’ is /sona/ (सोना) in Hindi and /hono/ (होनो) in the Marwari dialect of Rajasthani. Furthermore, there are a number of vowel substitutions, and the Hindi /l/ sound (ल) is often realized in Rajasthani as a retroflex lateral /ɭ/ (ळ).

Phonology
Rajasthani has 10 vowels and 31 consonants. The Rajasthani language Bagri has developed three lexical tones: low, mid and high.

Morphology
Rajasthani has two numbers and two genders with three cases. Postpositions are of two categories, inflexional and derivational. Derivational postpositions are mostly omitted in actual discourse.

Syntax
Rajasthani belongs to the languages that mix three types of case marking systems: nominative – accusative: transitive (A) and intransitive (S) subjects have similar case marking, different from that of transitive object (O); absolutive-ergative (S and O have similar marking, different from A), tripartite (A, S and O have different case marking). There is a general tendency existing in the languages with split nominal systems: the split is usually conditioned by the referents of the core NPs, the probability of ergative marking increasing from left to right in the following nominal hierarchy: first person pronouns – second person pronouns – demonstratives and third person pronouns – proper nouns – common nouns (human – animate – inanimate). Rajasthani split case marking system partially follows this hierarchy:first and second person pronouns have similar A and S marking, the other pronouns and singular nouns are showing attrition of A/S opposition.
Agreement: 1. Rajasthani combines accusative/tripartite marking in nominal system with consistently ergative verbal concord: the verb agrees with both marked and unmarked O in number and gender (but not in person — contrast Braj). Another peculiar feature of Rajasthani is the split in verbal concord when the participial component of a predicate agrees with O-NP while the auxiliary verb might agree with A-NP. 2. Stative participle from transitive verbs may agree with the Agent. 3. Honorific agreement of feminine noun implies masculine plural form both in its modifiers and in the verb.
In Hindi and Punjabi only a few combinations of transitive verbs with their direct objects may form past participles modifying the Agent: one can say in Hindi:‘Hindī sīkhā ādmī’ – ‘a man who has learned Hindi’ or ‘sāṛī bādhī aurāt’ – ‘a woman in sari’, but *‘kitāb paṛhā ādmī ‘a man who has read a book’ is impossible. Semantic features of verbs whose perfective participles may be used as modifiers are described in (Dashchenko 1987). Rajasthani seems to have less constrains on this usage, compare bad in Hindi but normal in Rajasthani.
Rajasthani has retained an important feature of ergative syntax lost by the other representatives of Modern Western New Indo-Aryan (NIA), namely, the free omission of Agent NP from the perfective transitive clause.
Rajasthani is the only Western NIA language where the reflexes of Old Indo-Aryan synthetic passive have penetrated into the perfective domain.
Rajasthani as well as the other NIA languages shows deviations from Baker’s 'mirror principle', that requires the strict pairing of morphological and syntactic operations (Baker 1988). The general rule is that the 'second causative' formation implies a mediator in the argument structure. However, some factors block addition of an extra agent into the causative construction.
In the typical Indo-Aryan relative-correlative construction the modifying clause is usually marked by a member of the "J" set of relative pronouns, adverbs and other words, while the correlative in the main clause is identical with the remote demonstrative (except in Sindhi and in Dakhini). Gujarati and Marathi frequently delete the preposed "J" element. In Rajasthani the relative pronoun or adverb may also be deleted from the subordinate clause but – as distinct from the neighbouring NIA – relative pronoun or adverb may be used instead of correlative.
Relative pronoun 'jakau' may be used not only in relative/correlative constructions, but also in complex sentences with "cause/effect" relations.

Prominent linguists
Linguists and their work and year: [Note: Works concerned only with linguistics, not with literature]
Amitabh V. Dwivedi: Hadoti, 2015
Anvita Abbi: Bagri, 1993
Christopher Shackle: Bagri and Saraiki, 1976
David Magier: Marwari, 1983
George Abraham Grierson: Almost all the dialects of Rajasthani, 1920
George Macalister: Dhundhari and Shekhawati, 1892
Gopal Parihar: Bagri, 2004–present
Gulab Chand: Hadoti, 2018
John D. Smith: Rajasthani, 1970–present
J. C. Sharma: Gade lohar, Bagri or Bhili, Gojri, 1970–present
Kali Charan Bahl: Rajasthani, 1971–1989
Kan Singh Parihar: English, Sanskrit, Hindi, Marwari, Rajasthani, 1940
K. C. Agrawal: Shekhawati, 1964
L. P. Tessitori: Rajasthani and Marwari, 1914–16
Lakhan Gusain: all the dialects of Rajasthani, 1990–present
Liudmila Khokhlova: Rajasthani and Marwari, 1990–present
Maxwell P Philips: Bhili, 2000–present.
Narottam Das Swami: Rajasthani and Marwari, 1960
Peter E. Hook: Rajasthani and Marwari, 1986
Ram Karan Asopa: Rajasthani and Marwari, 1890–1920
Sita Ram Lalas: Rajasthani language, 1950–1970
Saubhagya Singh Shekhawat Rajasthani, Rajasthani Shabd-Kosh part I Sanshodhan Parivardhan, 1945–present
Suniti Kumar Chatterjee: Rajasthani, 1948–49
W.S. Allen: Harauti and Rajasthani, 1955–60

Works on Rajasthani grammar

Agrawal, K.C. 1964. Shekhawati boli ka varnatmak adhyayan. Lucknow: Lucknow University
Allen, W.S. 1957. Aspiration in the Harauti nominal. Oxford: Studies in Linguistics
Allen, W.S. 1957. Some phonological characteristics of Rajasthani. Bulletin of the School of Oriental and African Studies, 20:5–11
Allen, W.S. 1960. Notes on the Rajasthani Verb. Indian Linguistics, 21:1–13
Asopa, R.K. 1950. Marwari Vyakaran. Jaipur: Popular Prakashan
Bahl, K.C. 1972. On the present state of Modern Rajasthani Grammar. Jodhpur: Rajasthani Shodh Samsthan, Chaupasani (Rajasthani Prakirnak Prakashan Pushp, 5)
Bahl, K.C. 1980. aadhunik raajasthaani kaa sanracanaatamak vyaakaran . Jodhpur: Rajasthani Shodh Samsthan
Chand, Gulab. 2012. An Analysis of Sociolinguistic Variation & Style in Harauti. M.Phil Dissertation. Wardha: Mahatma Gandhi Antarashtriya Hindi University.
Chand, Gulab. and Kar, Somdev. 2017. Revival of Endangered Languages: A Case Study of Hadoti. International Journal of Dravidian Linguistics (IJDL), Dravidian Linguistics Association, Vol. 46 No.2, 153-170, (ISSN No. 0378-2484).
Chand, Gulab. 2018. The Phonology of reduplication in Hadoti: An Optimality Theoretic Approach. PhD Thesis. Ropar: IIT Ropar
Chand, Gulab. and Kar, Somdev. 2020. REDUPLICATION INITIATED THROUGH DISCOURSE MARKERS: A CASE OF HADOTI." DIALECTOLOGIA, No. 25, 113-136, University of Barcelona, Spain. (ISSN: 2013-2247).

Chatterji, S.K. 1948. Rajasthani Bhasha. Udaipur: Rajasthan Vidayapith

Dwivedi, A.V. 2012. A Descriptive Grammar of Hadoti. München: Lincom Europa
Gusain, Lakhan. 1994. Reflexives in Bagri. M.Phil. dissertation. New Delhi: Jawaharlal Nehru University
Gusain, Lakhan. 1999. A Descriptive Grammar of Bagri. Ph.D. dissertation. New Delhi: Jawaharlal Nehru University
Gusain, Lakhan. 2000a. Limitations of Literacy in Bagri. Nicholas Ostler & Blair Rudes (eds.). Endangered Languages and Literacy. Proceedings of the Fourth FEL Conference. University of North Carolina, Charlotte, 21–24 September 2000
Gusain, Lakhan. 2000b. Bagri. München: Lincom Europa (Languages of the World/Materials, 384)
Gusain, Lakhan. 2001. Shekhawati. München: Lincom Europa (Languages of the World/Materials, 385)
Gusain, Lakhan. 2002. Endangered Language: A Case Study of Sansiboli. M.S. Thirumalai(ed.). Language in India, Vol. 2:9
Gusain, Lakhan. 2003. Mewati. München: Lincom Europa (Languages of the World/Materials, 386)
Gusain, Lakhan. 2004. Marwari. München: Lincom Europa (Languages of the World/Materials, 427)
Gusain, Lakhan. 2005. Mewari. München: Lincom Europa (Languages of the World/Materials, 431)
Gusain, Lakhan. 2006. Dhundhari. München: Lincom Europa (Languages of the World/Materials, 435)
Gusain, Lakhan. 2007. Harauti. München: Lincom Europa (Languages of the World/Materials, 434)
Gusain, Lakhan. 2008. Wagri. München: Lincom Europa (Languages of the World/Materials, 437)
Hook, Peter and Man Singh Mohabbat Singh Chauhan. 1986. Grammatical Capture in Rajasthani. Scott DeLancey and Russell Tomlin, (eds.), Proceedings of the Second Annual Meeting of the Pacific Linguistics Conference. Eugene: Deptt. of Linguistics. 203-20
Hook, Peter and Man Singh Mohabbat Singh Chauhan.1988. The Perfective Adverb in Bhitrauti. Word 39:177-86
Hook, Peter and Man Singh Mohabbat Singh Chauhan. 1988. On the Functions and Origin of the Extended Verb in Southern Rajasthani. Gave.sa.naa 51:39–57
Khokhlova, Liudmila Viktorovna. in press. "Infringement of Morphological and Syntactic Operations' Pairing in "Second Causative" Formation (Hindi-Urdu, Punjabi, Gujarati, Rajasthani)." Indian Linguistics 64.
Khokhlova, Liudmila. 2001 Ergativity Attrition in the history of western New Indo-Aryan Languages (Panjabi, Gujarati, Rajasthani). In The Yearbook of South Asian Languages and Linguistics. Tokyo Symposium on South Asian Languages. Contact, Convergence and Typology. Edpp.158–184, ed. by P. Bhaskararao & K.V. Subbarao. New Delhi-London: Sage Publication
Lalas, S.R. 1962–78. Rajasthani Sabad Kol. 9 Volumes. Jodhpur: Rajasthani Shodh Samsthan
Macalister, George. 1898. A Dictionary of the Dialects Spoken in the State of Jeypore. 1st edition. Allahabad: Allahabad Mission Press
Magier, David S. 1983. Topics in the Grammar of Marwari. Ph.D. dissertation, University of California
Magier, David S. 1984. Transitivity and valence: Some lexical processes in Marwari. Berkeley Linguistic Society 10
Magier, David S. 1985. Case and Transitivity in Marwari.  Arlene R.K. Zide, David Magier & Eric Schiller (eds.). Proceedings of the Conference on Participant Roles: South Asia and Adjacent Areas. An Ancillary Meeting of the CLS Regional Meeting, 25 April 1984, University of Chicago. Bloomington, Indiana: Indiana University Linguistics Club. 149-59
Miltner, V. 1964. Old Gujarati, Middle Gujarati, and Middle Rajasthani sentence structure. Bharatiya Vidya 24:9–31
Phillips, Maxwell P (2012) Dialect Continuum in the Bhil Tribal Belt: Grammatical Aspects. PhD Thesis, SOAS, University of London 
Sakaria, B. & B. Sakaria. 1977. Rajasthani-Hindi Shabda-Kosh. Jaipur: Panchsheel Prakashan
Shackle, Christopher (1976). The Saraiki Language of Central Pakistan: A Reference Grammar. London: School of Oriental and African Studies.
Shackle, Christopher (1977). "Saraiki: A Language Movement in Pakistan". Modern Asian Studies 11 (3): 279–403.
Smith, J.D. 1975. An Introduction to the Language of the Historical Documents from Rajasthan. Modern Asian Studies 9.4:433-64
Swami, N.D. 1960. Sankshipta Rajasthani Vyakaran. Bikaner: Rajasthani Research Institute
Swami, N.D. 1975. Rajasthani Vyakaran. Bikaner: Navyug
Tessitori, L.P. 1914-16. Notes on the Grammar of Old Western Rajasthani. Indian Antiquary:43-5

See also
List of Rajasthani Poets
Rajasthani literature
Rajasthani people

References

External links

Mahajani script

 
Languages of Rajasthan
Languages of India
Rajasthani literature
Sahitya Akademi recognised languages